The Hollywood Gold Cup Stakes is a Grade I American thoroughbred horse race for horses age three and older over a distance of  miles on the dirt held at Santa Anita Park in Arcadia, California in May.  The race currently offers a purse of $400,000.

History

Early beginnings 
The race inaugurated in 1938 at Hollywood Park Racetrack in Inglewood, California as the Hollywood Gold Cup.

Hollywood Park Racetrack opened its doors on June 10, 1938, and Seabiscuit, under jockey George Woolf, won the $50,000 added race's inaugural running on July 16.

The race was not run in 1942 or 1943, due to Hollywood Park being closed and used as an airplane parts storage depot during World War II.

Post World War II 
In 1949, the Hollywood Gold Cup, as well as the entire 1949 meeting, was held at Santa Anita Park, due to a devastating fire at Hollywood Park on the night of May 5, 1949. Solidarity won the 1949 running on July 16. The Hollywood Park grandstand was rebuilt and the facility reopened in time for a two-part split 1950 season. The 1950 Hollywood Gold Cup, won by Noor, was held in the second part or Fall–Winter part of the split, on December 9, 1950. The following summer, the race returned to its usual mid-July running and Citation, in his final race, won the Hollywood Gold Cup on July 14, 1951, becoming the first thoroughbred racehorse to hit the career earnings mark of one million dollars.

Modern Era

In 1980, Mary Lou Tuck became the first woman trainer to win the Hollywood Gold Cup with Go West Young Man.

In 1999, the Blood-Horse magazine List of the Top 100 U.S. Racehorses of the 20th Century was published, and fourteen horses on the list had won the Hollywood Gold Cup: Citation, Affirmed, Round Table, Cigar, Swaps, Seabiscuit, Skip Away, Gallant Man, Challedon, Ack Ack, Native Diver, Noor, Two Lea and Exceller.

In the 73rd running of the Hollywood Gold Cup in 2012, Chantal Sutherland, aboard Game On Dude, became the first female jockey to win the race. Game On Dude had also been Sutherland's mount in the previous year's running, finishing second by a nose to First Dude. The ride had given Sutherland the distinction of being the first female jockey to have a mount in the Hollywood Gold Cup.

Fillies or Mare winners 

Only three fillies or mares have ever won the (Hollywood) Gold Cup. Happy Issue was the first in 1944, followed by Two Lea in 1952 and Princessnesian in 1968.

Change of venue 
Following the closure of Hollywood Park, the race moved to Santa Anita Park in 2014 (where the race was run in 1949 because of a fire at Hollywood Park) and renamed the Gold Cup at Santa Anita Stakes.

The event is a Breeders' Cup Classic "Win and You're In" qualifier.

The event is one of the premier distance races on the West Coast of the United States, along with the Santa Anita Handicap from Santa Anita Park, and the Pacific Classic Stakes at Del Mar Racetrack.

In 2020 the name of the event reverted to the Hollywood Gold Cup.

Race conditions
It was run as a handicap race until 1997, when it was switched to weight-for-age conditions.  In 2005, the Gold Cup returned to the original handicap format.

Records
Time record: 
 1:58.20 – Quack (1972) (on natural dirt) (New track record, equaled world record)
 2:00.75 – Rail Trip (2009) (on Cushion Track)

Most wins:
 3 – Native Diver (1965, 1966, 1967)
 3 – Lava Man (2005, 2006, 2007)

Most wins by an owner:
 3 – Charles S. Howard (1938, 1939, 1950)
 3 – Calumet Farm (1951, 1952, 1990)
 3 – Louis K. Shapiro (1965, 1966, 1967)
 3 – STD Racing Stable/Jason Wood (2005, 2006, 2007)

Most wins by a jockey:
 9 – Laffit Pincay Jr. (1970, 1975, 1977, 1979, 1982, 1985, 1986, 2001, 2002)

Most wins by a trainer:
 8 – Charles E. Whittingham (1971, 1972, 1973, 1974, 1978, 1982, 1985, 1987)
 8 – Bob Baffert (1999, 2003, 2011, 2012, 2013, 2017, 2020, 2021)

Winners

Legend:

 
 

Notes:

† Futural won the race but was disqualified for interference

§ Ran as part of an entry

° Caterman was first past the post but was disqualified and placed second

∞ Filly or Mare

See also
 List of American and Canadian Graded races
 Gold Cup at Santa Anita top three finishers

References

External links
 Santa Anita Media Guide for 2019 Winter Meet
 Ten Things You Should Know About the Hollywood Gold Cup at Hello Race Fans

Horse races in California
Hollywood Park Racetrack
Santa Anita Park
Grade 1 stakes races in the United States
Open middle distance horse races
1938 establishments in California
Recurring sporting events established in 1938